The women's 3000 metres event at the 1996 World Junior Championships in Athletics was held in Sydney, Australia, at International Athletic Centre on 21 and 22 August.

Medalists

Results

Final
22 August

Heats
21 August

Heat 1

Heat 2

Participation
According to an unofficial count, 19 athletes from 14 countries participated in the event.

References

3000 metres
Long distance running at the World Athletics U20 Championships